Prelude to a Kiss: The Duke Ellington Album is a studio album by American jazz singer Dee Dee Bridgewater, recorded in tribute to Duke Ellington. The album was released on October 8, 1996 by Philips Records label. The album title was borrowed from the Ellington's tune. The release contais 12 tracks, which include the pop sounds of the Hollywood Bowl Orchestra.

Reception
Marcela Breton of JazzTimes wrote, "Do we really need another reworking of the Ellington oeuvre? Enough already. Ellington gets nearly as much attention as John F. Kennedy, Jr... I like Bridgewater’s vocals on "Caravan" and "Bli-Blip," and Bobby Watson’s alto sax on "Midnight Indigo." Mike Joyce in his review for The Washington Post commented, "Duke Ellington's music has a calming effect on jazz vocalist Dee Dee Bridgewater, and that's a good thing. As talented as she is, Bridgewater is fond of embarking on extended scat flights that sometimes turn strident and long-winded. Not here, though." Ken Dryden of AllMusic noted, "But it is her hypnotic, chanting introduction, backed by Middle Eastern percussion and Steve Turre's conch shells, that gives this release an occasional freshness usually lacking in similar Ellington tributes."

Track listing

Personnel
Dee Dee Bridgewater – vocals
Bobby Watson – alto saxophone
Charles McPherson – alto saxophone
Ira Coleman – bass 
Jeff Hamilton – drum
Cyro Baptista – percussion
Cyrus Chestnut – piano
Steve Turre – trombone
Wynton Marsalis – trumpet
Hassan Hakmoun – vocals, percussion, gimbra
John Mauceri – conductor

References

1996 albums
Dee Dee Bridgewater albums
Philips Records albums